Rainier was the Margrave of Tuscany from 1014 until 1027. After the death of the Emperor Henry II, of whom he had been a supporter, he opposed Conrad II. When Conrad descended into Italy to receive the Iron Crown and the Holy Roman Emperorship, he had to fight and depose Rainier, replacing him with his own supporter, Boniface of Canossa.

References

Margraves of Tuscany
1027 deaths
Year of birth unknown